A true toad is any member of the family Bufonidae, in the order Anura (frogs and toads). This is the only family of anurans in which all members are known as toads, although some may be called frogs (such as harlequin frogs). The bufonids now comprise more than 35 genera, Bufo being the best known.

History 

Bufonidae is thought to have originated in South America. Some studies date the origin of the group to after the breakup of Gondwana, about 78–98 million years ago in the Late Cretaceous. In contrast, other studies have dated the origin of the group to the early Paleocene. The bufonids likely radiated out of South America during the Eocene, with the entire radiation occurring during the Eocene to Oligocene, marking an extremely rapid divergence likely facilitated by the Paleogene's changing climatic conditions.

Taxonomy 
The following phylogeny of most genera in the family is based on Portik and Papenfuss, 2015:, Chan et al., 2016, Chandramouli et al., 2016, and Kok et al., 2017

Ingerophrynus alongside Leptophryne was grouped as basal to the clade containing all other Southeast Asian toad genera and Ghatophryne by Portik and Papenfuss, but was found to group with Phrynoidis and Rentapia by Chan et al. Ghatophryne was grouped with Phrynoidis and Rentapia by Portik and Papenfuss but was found to group with Pelophryne and Ansonia by Chan et al. In addition, Sabahphrynus was grouped with Strauchbufo and Bufo by Portik and Papenfuss but was found to group with Pelophryne, Ansonia, and Ghatophryne by Chan et al.

Characteristics
True toads are widespread and are native to every continent except Australia and Antarctica, inhabiting a variety of environments, from arid areas to rainforest. Most lay eggs in paired strings that hatch into tadpoles, although, in the genus Nectophrynoides, the eggs hatch directly into miniature toads.

All true toads are toothless and generally warty in appearance. They have a pair of parotoid glands on the back of their heads. These glands contain an alkaloid poison which the toads excrete when stressed. The poison in the glands contains a number of toxins causing different effects. Bufotoxin is a general term.  Different animals contain significantly different substances and proportions of substances. Some, like the cane toad Rhinella marina, are more toxic than others. Some "psychoactive toads", such as the Colorado River toad Incilius alvarius, have been used recreationally for the effects of their bufotoxin.

Depending on the species, male or female toads may possess a Bidder's organ, a trait unique to all bufonids except genera Melanophryniscus and Truebella. Under the right conditions, the organ becomes an active ovary.

The loss of teeth has arisen in frogs independently over 20 times. Notably, all members of Bufonidae are toothless. Another Anuran family with a comparable degree of edentulism is the family Microhylidae.

Reproduction
Internal fertilization occurs in four bufonid genera.
Mertensophryne (some species)
Nectophrynoides (presumably all species)
Altiphrynoides malcolmi (one out of two species in the genus Altiphrynoides)
Nimbaphrynoides occidentalis (the sole species in the monotypic genus Nimbaphrynoides)

Ascaphus (all species) and Eleutherodactylus (two species, E. coqui and E. jasperi) are the only other frog genera that have internal fertilization. Limnonectes larvaepartus also has internal fertilization.

Taxonomy and genera
The family Bufonidae contains over 570 species among 52 genera.

References

 
 Stebbins, Robert. Western Reptiles & Amphibians (3rd ed.). Houghton Mifflin Co., 2003.
 Halliday, Tim R., and Kraig Adler (editors). The New Encyclopedia of Reptiles & Amphibians. Facts on File, New York, 2002.

External links

Tolweb.org: Bufonidae
Bufonidae.com
Amphibian and Reptiles of Peninsular Malaysia - Family Bufonidae
FED.us
Bufonidae recordings from the British Library Sound Archive

Extant Thanetian first appearances
Amphibian families
Taxa named by John Edward Gray